The Old Log Post Office, also known as the Franklin Post Office is an historic building located in Franklin, Ohio. Built in 1802, the two-story log cabin is the oldest surviving post office in the state and the oldest building in Franklin.

On  April 1, 1805, President Thomas Jefferson appointed the first postmaster, John N. C. Schenck.  The post office was his home. It was originally at 310 River Street but was moved to its present site near the corner of 5th and River streets in 1974.  A portion of the Great Miami River Recreation Trail, a bicycle trail, now passes by the post office.

On March 17, 1976, it was added to the National Register of Historic Places.

See also
 List of Registered Historic Places in Warren County, Ohio

References

External links
 Log Post Office - Franklin Area Historical Society
 Post office is focus of city's bicentennial

National Register of Historic Places in Warren County, Ohio
Post office buildings on the National Register of Historic Places in Ohio
Buildings and structures in Warren County, Ohio
Museums in Warren County, Ohio
History museums in Ohio
Philatelic museums in the United States